Acer caudatifolium is an Asian species of maple, found only in Taiwan.  The species is sometimes confused with another Taiwanese tree, Acer morrisonense. This species has been known to reach 20 metres tall. Leaves are non-compound, the blade narrowly ovate, up to 11 cm long by 4.5 cm wide, with serrate margins but no lobes.

References

External links

caudatifolium
Plants described in 1911
Endemic flora of Taiwan
Trees of Taiwan
Taxa named by Bunzō Hayata